The following highways are numbered 29:

Canada
 Alberta Highway 29
 British Columbia Highway 29
 Manitoba Highway 29 (former)
 Ontario Highway 29
 Saskatchewan Highway 29

Czech Republic
 I/29 Highway; Czech: Silnice I/29

India
  National Highway 29 (India)

Ireland
  N29 road (Ireland)

Italy
 Autostrada A29

Japan
 Japan National Route 29
 Chūgoku Expressway
 Tottori Expressway
 Harima Expressway

Korea, South
 Sejong–Pocheon Expressway
 National Route 29

Montenegro
 R-29 regional road (Montenegro)

New Zealand
 New Zealand State Highway 29
  New Zealand State Highway 29A

United Kingdom
 British A29 (Bognor Regis-Capel)
 A29 road (Northern Ireland)

United States
 Interstate 29
 U.S. Route 29
 Alabama State Route 29 (former)
 Arkansas Highway 29
 California State Route 29
 County Route J29 (California)
 County Route S29 (California)
 Florida State Road 29
 County Road 29 (Collier County, Florida)
 Georgia State Route 29
 Idaho State Highway 29
 Illinois Route 29
 Indiana State Road 29
 County Route C29 (Humboldt County, Iowa)
 Kentucky Route 29
 Louisiana Highway 29
 Maryland Route 29 (former)
 M-29 (Michigan highway)
 Minnesota State Highway 29
 County Road 29 (Sherburne County, Minnesota)
 County Road 29 (Washington County, Minnesota)
 Mississippi Highway 29
 Nebraska Highway 29
 Nevada State Route 29 (former)
 New Jersey Route 29
 County Route 29 (Bergen County, New Jersey)
 County Route 29 (Monmouth County, New Jersey)
 New Mexico State Road 29
 New York State Route 29
 County Route 29 (Allegany County, New York)
 County Route 29 (Cattaraugus County, New York)
 County Route 29 (Chenango County, New York)
 County Route 29 (Clinton County, New York)
 County Route 29 (Columbia County, New York)
 County Route 29 (Delaware County, New York)
 County Route 29 (Dutchess County, New York)
 County Route 29 (Essex County, New York)
 County Route 29 (Oneida County, New York)
 County Route 29 (Ontario County, New York)
 County Route 29 (Orange County, New York)
 County Route 29 (Otsego County, New York)
 County Route 29 (Rensselaer County, New York)
 County Route 29 (Rockland County, New York)
 County Route 29 (Saratoga County, New York)
 County Route 29 (Schoharie County, New York)
 County Route 29 (Suffolk County, New York)
 County Route 29 (Tioga County, New York)
 County Route 29 (Ulster County, New York)
 County Route 29 (Wyoming County, New York)
 County Route 29 (Yates County, New York)
 North Carolina Highway 29 (former)
 North Dakota Highway 29 (former)
 Ohio State Route 29
 Oklahoma State Highway 29
Tualatin Valley Highway No. 29 in Oregon
 Pennsylvania Route 29
 Tennessee State Route 29
 Texas State Highway 29
 Farm to Market Road 29 (former)
 Texas Park Road 29
 Utah State Route 29
 Virginia State Route 29 (1923-1933) (former)
 State Route 29 (Virginia 1933-1947) (former)
 West Virginia Route 29
 Wisconsin Highway 29

Territories
 Puerto Rico Highway 29

See also
List of highways numbered 29A